Farstucker is the fourth studio album from Belgian electronic band Lords of Acid.  It was released on February 27, 2001 on Antler-Subway Records and marks the band's full transition from the new beat sound of their earlier work to an industrial music collective, with use of more live instruments.  This is the first Lords of Acid album to be released following the departure of founding member Nikkie Van Lierop (aka Jade 4 U), and the first featuring new vocalist Deborah Ostrega.

Lyrically, Lords of Acid maintain their trademark themes of sex, drugs and hedonism.

Jade 4 U provides backing vocals on "Rover Take Over".

Farstucker peaked at number 160 on the  U.S. Billboard 200 chart.  Like prior studio albums Lust, Voodoo-U and Our Little Secret, Farstucker was re-issued in 2002 in a "Stript" version, with all vocals removed.

The title is a spoonerism of "Starfucker".

Track listing

Personnel 
 Maurice Engelen (aka Praga Khan) - Vocals, synthesizers, drum programming
 Deborah Ostrega - vocals
 Olivier Adams - synthesizers, engineering
 Wim Daans - guitars, synthesizers
 Erhan Kurkun - bass
 Kurt Liekens - drums, electronic percussion

References

2000 albums
Lords of Acid albums
Industrial albums by Belgian artists